The Affair at Little Egg Harbor took place on October 15, 1778, in southern New Jersey during the American Revolutionary War. American Loyalists killed nearly 50 Patriot men, bayonetting them as they slept. The battle took place about one week after the Battle of Chestnut Neck, a British raid aimed at suppressing privateers who used the area as a base to harass and seize British ships and their cargoes.

Background

British Army officer Captain Patrick Ferguson led a raid on Chestnut Neck, on the Mullica River, to retrieve supplies taken by privateers and try to stop their use of the town as a base for the distribution of their prizes and shipment of captured goods to General Washington at Valley Forge.

Count Kazimierz Pułaski and his newly raised forces were ordered to oppose his actions.  Pulaski's Legion, along with three companies of light infantry, three troops of light horse, and one artillery detachment, arrived the day after Ferguson departed Chestnut Neck.   But their arrival did stop Ferguson from raiding the iron works at BatstoPlan was to attack Batsto, but the river proved to shallow and time ran out, Batsto remained untouched.
 and stemmed their attacks on privateers at The Forks of the Mullica River. For a week the two forces were at a standoff.

Attack

Pulaski's troops reached the Little Egg Harbor district (near present-day Tuckerton), and immediately set up camp on a farm.

Lt. Gustav Juliet, a deserter, found Ferguson and told him of Pulaski's encampment; he mentioned that morale was fairly low, and security almost nonexistent. Ferguson promptly loaded 250 of his best men onto boats and rowed them, in the dark, some ten miles to what is now Osborne Island.  He marched them two miles to the site of the infantry outpost, which comprised fifty men a short distance from the main encampment. At first light, Ferguson ordered the attack; he took only five prisoners and his men, all American Loyalists, killed nearly 50 men.

Pulaski eventually led up his mounted troops, causing Ferguson to retreat to his boats, and leaving a few men who had fallen into the Patriot colonists' hands.

Legacy
The farm land which was the site of the battle has been developed as the Country Club Estates; a small parcel of the colonial farm was preserved on a plot of land between Hollybrook Drive and Cedarbrook Lane.
The Pulaski Monument is located on Pulaski Blvd in the Mystic Island section of Little Egg Harbor.

See also
 American Revolutionary War § Stalemate in the North. Places 'Affair at Little Egg Harbor' in overall sequence and strategic context.

References

Information adapted from Boatner's Landmarks of the American Revolution'', 1992 ed.

1778 in the United States
Little Egg Harbor
Little Egg Harbor
Little Egg Harbor
Little Egg Harbor
Little Egg Harbor
Ocean County, New Jersey
1778 in New Jersey
Privateering in the American Revolutionary War
Little Egg Harbor
Little Egg Harbor
Massacres in 1778
1778 murders in the United States